Sokolivka may refer to the following places in Ukraine:

Cherkasy Oblast
Sokolivka, Cherkasy Oblast, village in Uman Raion

Chernihiv Oblast
Sokolivka, Chernihiv Raion, Chernihiv Oblast, village in Chernihiv Raion
Sokolivka, Nizhyn Raion, Chernihiv Oblast, village in Nizhyn Raion

Dnipropetrovsk Oblast
Sokolivka, Dnipropetrovsk Oblast, village in Kamianske Raion

Ivano-Frankivsk Oblast
Sokolivka, Ivano-Frankivsk Raion, Ivano-Frankivsk Oblast, village in Ivano-Frankivsk Raion
Sokolivka, Kosiv Raion, Ivano-Frankivsk Oblast, village in Kosiv Raion

Kharkiv Oblast
Sokolivka, Kharkiv Oblast, village in Izium Raion

Khmelnytskyi Oblast
Sokolivka, Kamianets-Podilskyi Raion, Khmelnytskyi Oblast, village in Kamianets-Podilskyi Raion
Sokolivka, Khmelnytskyi Raion, Khmelnytskyi Oblast, village in Khmelnytskyi Raion

Kyiv Oblast
Sokolivka, Kyiv Oblast, village in Bila Tserkva Raion

Lviv Oblast
Sokolivka, Bibrka urban hromada, Lviv Raion, Lviv Oblast, village in Bibrka urban hromada, Lviv Raion
Sokolivka, Shchyrets settlement hromada, Lviv Raion, Lviv Oblast, village in Shchyrets settlement hromada, Lviv Raion
Sokolivka, Zolochiv Raion, Lviv Oblast, village in Zolochiv Raion

Mykolaiv Oblast
Sokolivka, Bashtanka Raion, Mykolaiv Oblast, village in Bashtanka Raion
Sokolivka, Pervomaisk Raion, Mykolaiv Oblast, village in Pervomaisk Raion
Sokolivka, Voznesensk Raion, Mykolaiv Oblast, village in Voznesensk Raion

Ternopil Oblast
Sokolivka, Ternopil Oblast, village in Kremenets Raion

Vinnytsia Oblast
Sokolivka, Pohrebyshche Raion, Vinnytsia Oblast, former village in Pohrebyshche Raion
Sokolivka, Tulchyn Raion, Vinnytsia Oblast, village in Kryzhopil settlement hromada, Tulchyn Raion
Sokolivka, Vinnytsia Raion, Vinnytsia Oblast, village in Lityn settlement hromada, Vinnytsia Raion

Zaporizhzhia Oblast
Sokolivka, Zaporizhzhia Oblast, village in Zaporizhzhia Raion